Gabriele Aldegani (born 10 May 1976) is a retired Italian footballer who played as a goalkeeper.

Football career
Aldegani started his senior career at Miranese of Serie D. in 1994 he was signed by A.C. Milan reserve team in 1994. He spent 6 seasons in temporary deals in Serie B and Serie C1 clubs. In 2003, he was signed by Rimini of Serie C1; in the next season he moved to Serie B club Piacenza. In 2006, he was signed by Bari. In July 2007 he was signed by Avellino. Aldegani was an unused bench against Ascoli in 2007–08 Coppa Italia before leaving the club in the same transfer window.

Chievo
Chievo called Aldegani for backup goalkeeper on 30 August 2007, although he wore no.1 in the 2008–09 season. He made his Serie A debut on 31 May 2009 against S.S.C. Napoli, the last match day of the season.

Grosseto
He signed for Grosseto on 10 February 2010.

Benevento & Cremonese
In summer 2010 he was signed by Benevento Calcio. On 31 January 2011 he was signed by U.S. Cremonese in temporary deal.

Nocerina & Livorno
In February 2012 he was signed by A.S.G. Nocerina on free transfer. On 31 January 2013 he was signed by A.S. Livorno Calcio in temporary deal, with Alfonso De Lucia moved to opposite direction. On 1 August 2013 the temporary deal was renewed; Aldegani played once for Livorno in 2013–14 Serie A.

Pescara
Aldegani became a free agent on 1 July 2014. On 18 September 2014 he was signed by Serie B club Delfino Pescara 1936. He immediately received call-up from the coach.

Honours
Chievo
Serie B: 2007–08

References

External links
Lega Serie B profile 

1976 births
A.C. ChievoVerona players
A.C. Milan players
A.C. Monza players
A.C. Prato players
S.S.C. Bari players
Cosenza Calcio 1914 players
U.S. Livorno 1915 players
Piacenza Calcio 1919 players
Rimini F.C. 1912 players
Treviso F.B.C. 1993 players
Benevento Calcio players
F.C. Grosseto S.S.D. players
U.S. Cremonese players
Delfino Pescara 1936 players
Serie A players
Serie B players
Serie C players
Association football goalkeepers
Italian footballers
Living people
Footballers from Venice